Trophic species are a scientific grouping of organisms according to their shared trophic (feeding) positions in a food web or food chain. Trophic species have identical prey and a shared set of predators in the food web. This means that members of a trophic species share many of the same kinds of ecological functions. The idea of trophic species was first devised by Joel Cohen and Frederick Briand in 1984 to redefine assessment of the ratio of predators to prey within a food web. The category may include species of plant, animal, a combination of plant and animal, and biological stages of an organism.  The reassessment grouped similar species according to habit rather than genetics. This resulted in a ratio of predator to prey in food webs is generally 1:1. By assigning groups in a trophic manner, relationships are linear in scale. This allows for predicting the proportion of different trophic links in a community food web.

References

Ecology
Systems ecology